Clio Glacier is a northeast-flowing glacier,  long, on the east side of Eurus Ridge in the Olympus Range, McMurdo Dry Valleys. In association with the names from Greek mythology grouped in this area, it was named by the New Zealand Geographic Board (1998) after Clio, the Greek muse of history.

References
 

Glaciers of Scott Coast